Chloropteryx tepperaria, the angle-winged emerald moth, is a moth of the family Geometridae. The species was first described by George Duryea Hulst in 1886 and it is found in the southeastern United States.

Description

Adults
Like many emerald moths, adults have green wings and a green body with a white area between the eyes. The hindwings have a pointed outer margin, motivating the descriptive English name "angle-winged emerald". Forewings and hindwings each have antemedial and postmedial lines of disconnected, white spots and tan and brown, checkered terminal and costal lines.

Range
The species' range extends from Texas and Oklahoma in the west to Florida and Pennsylvania in the east.

Life cycle

Adults
Adults have been reported from March to October north of Florida and year-round in Florida.

References

Geometrinae
Moths described in 1886